Walter Mondale (1928–2021) was an American lawyer and politician who served as the 42nd vice president of the United States.

Mondale may also refer to:

 Mondale (surname), an American surname of Norwegian origin 
 Mondale High School, school in the Western Cape, South Africa

See also 

 Montale (disambiguation)